Mary F. Carty was an American musician, songwriter and music arranger.

She worked with N. A. W. Carty.  She arranged "The Nation's Call for Humanity and Right".  She also arranged "Good-bye, Old Glory's Calling Me".

References

Bibliography
Parker, Bernard S. (2007). World War I sheet music: 9,670 patriotic songs published in the United States, 1914-1920, with more than 600 covers illustrated. Jefferson: McFarland & Company, Inc.  
Vogel, Frederick G. (1995). World War I Songs: A History and Dictionary of Popular American Patriotic Tunes, with Over 300 Complete Lyrics. Jefferson: McFarland & Company, Inc.  

American women songwriters
American music arrangers
Year of birth missing
Year of death missing